Acacia hexaneura, also known as Cowell spine-bush or the six-nerve spine-bush, is a shrub of the genus Acacia and the subgenus Plurinerves that is endemic to parts of South Australia.

Description
Like most species of Acacia it has phyllodes rather than true leaves. The phyllodes are attached directly by the base to the branchlet are rigid, straight or slightly recurved. The veins quite raised from the surface with well-defined ridges. It blooms between July and September producing simple inflorescences with spherical golden-yellow flower-heads.

Taxonomy
The species was first formally described by the botanists Richard Sumner Cowan and P.J.Lang in 1990 as part of the work Plant Portraits as published in the Journal of the Adelaide Botanic Gardens. It was reclassified as Racosperma hexaneurum by Leslie Pedley in 2003 then transferred back to genus Acacia in 2006.
The specific epithet is derived from the Greek words hex meaning six and neura meaning nerves in reference to the six nerves running along the length of the phyllodes.

Distribution
The shrub has a limited distribution in the north eastern part of the Eyre Peninsula of South Australia from around Kimba and Cowell where it is usually situated on small quartzite hills often combined with limestone or ironstone bedrock and growing in gravelly loams and sandy soils that are well drained.

See also
 List of Acacia species

References

hexaneura
Flora of South Australia
Plants described in 1990
Taxa named by Richard Sumner Cowan